The Biography of Ying-ying, also translated as the Story of Yingying, by Yuan Zhen, is a Tang dynasty chuanqi tale. It tells the story of a relationship conflicted between love and duty between a 16-year-old girl and a 21-year-old student. It is considered to be one of the first works of fiction in Chinese literature.

Role in history of Chinese literature

Yuan Zhen pioneered psychological exploration and possibilities of plot development. His tale mixed narration, poetry and letters from one character to another to demonstrate emotion rather than describe it, making it in one sense an epistolary novel. The work was also innovative because its characters, in the terms suggested by E.M. Forster, are "round" rather than "flat", that is, unlike the characters in the earlier zhiguai or zhiren tales, are not built around a single idea or quality, but have the power to surprise readers.  Recent critic Gu Mingdong suggests that with this tale, Chinese fiction "came of age", and the story provided themes for later plays, stories, and novels.

Yingying's Biography was one of three Tang Dynasty works particularly influential in the development of the caizi-jiaren (scholar and beauty story).

Among other works which it inspired was the Romance of the Western Chamber.

Plot

The young man, known only as "the student Zhang", is living in a rented dwelling in a Buddhist compound in the countryside some distance from a small city when a recently widowed woman, her daughter and son with an entourage befitting their wealth move into another rented dwelling in that compound. The father of the family died while stationed in some remote part of China, so the widow Cui (pronounced "tswei") is returning the family to Chang'an. They pause in their journey to recuperate from their long trek. Troops in the nearby city mutiny, so the student Zhang uses his friendly connections with influential men in that city to get a guard posted over the compound. The widow Cui and her group are made much more secure as a result of the student Zhang's pulling of strings. She gives a banquet to express her gratitude for Zhang's actions.

The widow Cui instructs her daughter to attend the banquet and to say "thank you" to the student Zhang. However, the daughter only appears because she is under duress and behaves in a most petulant and churlish manner. Nevertheless, she appears gloriously beautiful to Zhang despite her deliberately unkempt state. He has hitherto experienced no intimacy with anyone, and his companions have teased him about his lack of experience. There is no indication whatsoever that he has loving parents, siblings, or anyone in his life who is more to him than a mere acquaintance. He is immediately infatuated with this young woman who is so different from the young women who entertained his companions in the capital.

Zhang could not properly contact Cui Yingying directly. He arranges an indirect conduit through which he sends two "vernal" poems that the author of the story indicates would have conveyed no indecent propositions. Yingying responds with a poem that indicates romantic interest in "my lover", and invites him to come to her apartment after midnight. The student Zhang thinks that "his salvation [is] at hand", i.e., that he will at last find an end to the long dearth of affection in his life. However, when he keeps the appointment Yingying calls him a virtual rapist. He is totally crushed. Several nights later, Yingying comes to his apartment without prior arrangement and initiates intercourse with him. She says not a single word to him from the time she enters his apartment to the time she leaves at dawn the next day. Before long they establish a pattern in which Zhang would sneak into her dwelling each night, and sneak back out again the following dawn. Despite her daughter entertaining a virile man every night, the widow Cui does not intervene. When her daughter asks for her reaction she says, essentially, that her daughter has got herself into the current situation and should get herself out of it in any way she may choose.

After some months of the functional equivalent of young married life, the student Zhang has to go to the capital to take the yearly civil service examination that will determine whether he will be able to get a good job in the government. Yingying feels that Zhang is abandoning her. She blames him for attending to education and job seeking rather than staying with her. Zhang does not pass the examination and returns to the Buddhist compound. Yingying could use this juncture to renegotiate their relationship. Instead, everything continues as before. Every time Zhang does anything to try to get to know her better, she rebuffs him. When the time of the next examinations comes, Zhang again prepares to leave for the capital. Yingying is once more convinced that he is abandoning her. She eventually becomes very emotional about her "abandonment." Zhang leaves anyway.

When he arrives in the capital, he writes to Yingying and attempts to set out his true feelings for her. She responds with a letter that implies that Zhang has been untrue to her, is interested only in his own future as an official, etc. Zhang does not react to this letter by feeling guilty. Instead, he decides that the relationship is bad for him. He may also have realized that the relationship was bad for Yingying. The story is not clear at this point and only says that Zhang decides to end things, and that he makes certain rationalizations to his companions who thought he should let things go on as before.

After some time passed, the widow Cui manages to arrange a reasonably good marriage for Yingying. Zhang, too, finds a wife. When his official duties take him near to Yingying's new home, he attempts to visit her. She refuses to see him, but sends him a poem that indicates that she is thoroughly miserable, and that this sorrowful state of affairs is all Zhang's fault. Some days later she sends him a poem of farewell, saying that he should direct his energies toward making a good relationship with his wife. Afterwards Chang hears no more about her.

Translations
 James Hightower, "The Story of Yingying", in  pp. 1047–1057.
 Patrick Moran, "The Biography of Ying-ying — Enthrallment to Beauty, Destruction by Desire  (includes Chinese text), .]
 Owen, Stephen, "Yingying's Story", in Stephen Owen, ed. An Anthology of Chinese Literature: Beginnings to 1911. New York: W. W. Norton, 1997. p. 540-549 (Archive (Archive).
 Arthur Waley, "The Story of Ts'ui Yingying", More Translations From Chinese (1919) Sacred Texts (also in the Anthology of Chinese Literature by Cyril Birch, vol. I.;
 "The Story of Cui Yingying" (Archive" (Archive), Indiana University.

References and further reading
 
 Luo, Manling, "The Seduction Of Authenticity: 'The Story Of Yingying'." (Archive." (Archive). Nan Nü 7.1. Brill, Leiden, 2005. p. 40-70.
 
 Yu, Pauline. "The Story of Yingying" (Archive" (Archive). In: Yu, Pauline, Peter Bol, Stephen Owen, and Willard Peterson (editors). Ways with Words: Writing about Reading Texts from Early China (Volume 24 of Studies on China). University of California Press, 2000. , 9780520224667. p. 182-185.

Notes

External links

 Lament for Ying-ying Chinese Forums.

 
Stories within Taiping Guangji